An airline is a company that provides air transport services for passengers or freight.

Airline pr Air Line may also refer to:

Television
 Airline (1982 TV series), a British television series
 Airline (1998 TV series), a British television series
 Airline (American TV series) (2004–2005)
 Airlines (Indian TV series)

Other uses 
 Airline (brand), a line of consumer electronics sold by Montgomery Ward
 Airlines (video game), a simulation game
 Air line or airline, a tube that carries a compressed air supply
 "The Airline", a leg of State Route 9 in Maine, US
 Air Line, Georgia, a community
 Airline Highway, a highway in Louisiana, US
 Air-line railroad, a relatively flat and straight railroad
 Airline State Park, a park in Connecticut, US
 The Emirates Air Line, former name of the London Cable Car across the River Thames
 Santa Monica Air Line, a former interurban train route in Santa Monica, California
 Airline Inthyrath, American drag queen also known as Jujubee

See also
 Airline Road (disambiguation)
 Airliner